Cameroon competed at the 2004 Summer Olympics in Athens, Greece, from 13 to 29 August 2004.

Medalists

Athletics 

Cameroonian athletes have so far achieved qualifying standards in the following athletics events (up to a maximum of 3 athletes in each event at the 'A' Standard, and 1 at the 'B' Standard).

Men
Track & road events

Women
Track & road events

Field events

Boxing 

Cameroon sent four boxers to Athens. Three of them lost their first bout, while Hassan won two matches by decision before falling in the quarterfinals.  Their combined record was 2-4.

Judo

Four Cameroonian judoka qualified for the following events.

Swimming 

Cameroon selected one swimmer through a FINA invitation.

Men

Weightlifting 

Two Cameroonian weightlifters qualified for the following events:

References

External links
Official Report of the XXVIII Olympiad
Cameroon National Olympic & Sports Committee 

Nations at the 2004 Summer Olympics
2004
Olympics